Osypenko is a village (selo) in southern Ukraine. It is located in the Berdiansk Raion (district) of the Zaporizhzhia Oblast (province) just across from Berdiiansk on the left bank of river Berda.

The village was established in 1805 by runaway serfs from Poltava Governorate. Until 1939 it was known as Novospasivka. The village was renamed as Osypenko which is a proper last name for Polina Osipenko, born in the village, who survived an airplane crash of test flight from Moscow to the Russian Far East without landing, after the nearby city of Berdiansk was re-renamed.

Notable people
 Polina Osipenko, Soviet hero and aviator
 Viktor Bilash, Chief of Staff of the Revolutionary Insurgent Army of Ukraine (RIAU)

External links

Mariupolsky Uyezd
Villages in Berdiansk Raion